"If I Ever Go Crazy" is a song recorded by American country music group The Shooters. It was released in February 1989 as the second single from their album Solid as a Rock. The song peaked at number 17 on the Billboard Hot Country Singles chart and reached number 21 on the RPM Country Tracks chart in Canada. The song was written by the band's lead vocalist Walt Aldridge and his wife, Sheila.

Chart performance

References

1989 singles
The Shooters songs
Epic Records singles
Songs written by Walt Aldridge
1989 songs